BAZ-2215 Delfin (dolphin) is a small class minibus designed to transport passengers on city commercial routes. BAZ-2215 buses were assembled at two plants at once — BAZ and ChAZ. BAZ-2215 is a derived model from the widespread GAZelle. It is based on the chassis GAZ-3302, and the body design is the development of Ukrainian designers.

Description
The most noticeable difference is the height of the buses produced in Boryspil. They are much higher than the height of the GAZelle and allow passengers to stand in the cabin at full height. Due to this, as well as due to the presence of handrails in the cabin, standing passengers are allowed to travel. The cabin is equipped with fourteen chairs and is fenced off from the driver's cab with a partition. Passenger doors located in front of the body are automatic, there are also emergency manual doors in the back of the cabin. Wide windows provide a good overview; ventilation of the cabin is carried out with the help of one hatch in the roof and a vent on the side windows.

History
The first BAZ-2215 cars were assembled at the Boryspil Bus Factory in Prolisky, but the production facilities of this enterprise, where BAZ-A079 buses were already produced, were not enough to produce a new model alongside BAZ A079. Therefore, in August 2003, on the basis of the enterprise "ChernihivAvtoDetal", the Chernihiv Bus Factory was created, where in September of the same year the production of BAZ-2215 minibuses began. For some time, the machines were assembled at two factories at the same time but later BAZ had stopped their assembly and only Chernihiv kept producing the Delfin.

In 2003–2004, in addition to the standard modification, the Boryspil Bus Factory also produced buses on the chassis of the pre-restyling GAZelle. They received the BAZ-22151 index.

Since 2006, instead of BAZ-2215, its modification BAZ-22154 began to be produced. It has a ZMZ-405.22 engine, which meets the adopted standards of environmental safety in Ukraine, Euro-2. In addition, the updated "Dolphins" are equipped with the ABS system of the German company Wabco.

In 2010, the BAZ-22155 was presented, equipped with engine UMZ-4216 (Euro-3). Such machines are no different from BAZ-22154. In the same year, production of this family of buses stopped.

In total, more than 2,000 buses of the BAZ-2215 family were produced.

Technical characteristics

Modifications
 BAZ-2215 Delfin – base model
 BAZ-22151 Delfin – pre-restyling variation
 BAZ-22154 Delfin – Euro-2 standard variation
 BAZ-22155 Delfin – Euro-2 standard variation
 BAZ-3215 Delfin Maxi - three-axel bus based on BAZ-2215. Only two vehicles were released.

Gallery

References

Minibuses
Single-deck buses
Vehicles introduced in 2003
Buses
Buses of Ukraine